Chea Soth (3 March 192821 January 2012) was a Cambodian politician. He belonged to the Cambodian People's Party and was elected to represent Prey Veng Province in the National Assembly of Cambodia in 2003. He was Minister of Planning in the PRK government from 1982 to 1993.

Chea Soth died on 21 January 2012, at the age of 83.

References

1928 births
People's Republic of Kampuchea
Members of the National Assembly (Cambodia)
Cambodian People's Party politicians
2012 deaths